The North Atlantic Salmon Conservation Organization (NASCO) is a specialised regional fishery management organisation established under the Convention for the Conservation of Salmon in the North Atlantic Ocean from 1 October 1983.

The organization's mission is to contribute through consultation and cooperation to the conservation, restoration, enhancement and rational management of salmon stocks.

Its headquarters are in Edinburgh, United Kingdom.

It was established due to the failure of independent states to protect a global common such as the salmon population in this case. It was argued that international cooperation was necessary to prevent unsustainable over-fishing. The NASCO has established a handful of regulations and guidelines regarding the fishing of salmon, for example, countries are only able to fish within 12 nautical miles of their territory, prohibiting fishing in most of the North Atlantic.

In 2020, the NASCO operates with a budget of 636 630 GBP, with a little over 583 000 GBP coming from the member states.

Membership

Current participants (since 1984): Canada, Denmark (in respect of the Faroe Islands and Greenland), the European Union, Norway, Russian Federation, and the United States of America.

Former participants:
Iceland (1984-2009)
Finland (1984-1995)
Sweden (1984-1995)

The NASCO also has 44 NGOs from the different member states that have observational status during the annual meetings.

Organizational Organs
Council

North American Commission

North-East Atlantic Commission

West Greenland Commission

International Atlantic Salmon Research Board (IASRB)

Secretariat

The secretariat currently has 5 full-time employees based at the Headquarters in Edinburgh, Scotland.
In the council, each member state is represented and decisions are made based on a three quarter majority.

The main tasks of the council include:

Providing a forum for the study, analysis and exchange of information on salmon.

Coordinating the activities of the Commissions.

Establishing working arrangements with other fisheries and scientific organizations.

Making recommendations for scientific research.

References

External links
Official website

Fisheries conservation organizations
Organizations established in 1983
Salmon
Atlantic Ocean
Intergovernmental organizations established by treaty
Organisations based in Edinburgh